Amedeo Angeli (6 July 1911, Mariano del Friuli; 9 August 1965) was an Italian bobsledder who competed in the mid-1930s. He competed in the four-man event at the 1936 Winter Olympics in Garmisch-Partenkirchen, but did not finish.

References

External links
 
1936 bobsleigh four-man results
1936 Olympic Winter Games official report - p. 415.

1911 births
1965 deaths
Italian male bobsledders
Olympic bobsledders of Italy
Bobsledders at the 1936 Winter Olympics
People from Mariano del Friuli